Caryocolum alsinella is a moth of the family Gelechiidae. It is found throughout Europe It is also present in North Africa (including Morocco).

The length of the forewings is 4–5 mm. The forewings are mid-brown, speckled with white, particularly across one-fifth and the middle. There are indistinct black markings. Adults have been recorded on wing from late June to late September.

The larvae feed on Arenaria montana, Cerastium arvense, Cerastium diffusum, Cerastium fontanum, Cerastium semidecandrum, Minuartia verna, Moehringia and Stellaria species. Young larvae mine the leaves of their host plant. Later, the larvae feed on young shoots, flowers and seed-capsules which are spun together. The larvae have a yellow or light green body and a black head. They occur in spring and pupation takes place up to the end of June.

References

Moths described in 1868
alsinella
Moths of Europe
Moths of Africa